Yermak, Ermak or Jermak is both a given name and a surname. Notable people with the name include:

Yermak Timofeyevich (born between 1532–1542), Russian explorer and conqueror of Siberia
Andrii Yermak (born 1971), Ukrainian lawyer, film producer and politician
Gennady Ermak (born 1963), Soviet-born scientist and writer
Lolita Yermak (born 1996), Ukrainian ice dancer
Maksim Yermak (born 1976), Ukrainian footballer
Oleh Yermak (born 1986), Ukrainian footballer
Siarhiej Jermak, Belarus politician

Ukrainian-language surnames